The Tsemes Bay (also Tsemess Bay and Novorossiysk Bay; Russian: Цемесская бухта, Tsemesskaya bukhta) is an ice-free bay located on the north-eastern coast of the Black Sea, in Krasnodar Krai of Russia. The depth of the sea varies from 21 to 27 meters. The length of the bay is 15 kilometers; its maximum width is 9 kilometers.

Although navigation is affected by strong autumn and winter bora winds (up to 220 kilometers per hour),  ancient Greek navigators frequented the bay and established the  colony of  Bata on the shore. Michael Rostovtzeff explained this by the lack of any other decent harbours along the coastline between the bay and Batumi to the south. During the Middle Ages the Ghisolfi merchant family of Genoa controlled the coast.

Novorossiysk, founded by  Russians in 1838 as a military facility, is the chief port on the bay. In June 1918 Soviet Navy crews   scuttled several ships of the Black Sea Fleet in the bay to avoid their transfer to the  Germans. Several notable shipwrecks occurred in Tsemes bay, including that of  SS Admiral Nakhimov in 1986. Following the 1992 establishment of the Caspian Pipeline Consortium, the Commercial Seaport of Novorossiysk has emerged as the busiest oil terminal in the Black Sea.

References 

Novorossiysk
Bays of the Black Sea
Bays of Krasnodar Krai